Geoffrey Ricardo (born 1964) is an Australian contemporary visual artist whose work focuses on his sculpture and printmaking practice.

Biography
Ricardo was born in Melbourne, Australia. He is known for his Figurative work that centres around a narrative language, Ricardo works primarily in sculpture, printmaking, etching, lithography, & painting.
Ricardo was the winner of the 2009 Lorne Sculpture Exhibition. He has been a regular artist in residence at the Art Vault Mildura, along with other artists such as Mike Parr, Rick Amor, Rona Green, Tony Ameneiro and Heather Shimmen.
His work is represented in select major private and corporate collections, as well as public and university museum collections in all states of Australia including the National Gallery of Australia, Art Gallery of New South Wales, Queensland Art Gallery, State Library of Victoria and the Art Gallery of South Australia.

References

External links
 www.geoffreyricardo.com Artist's website
 Images of Ricardo's work held by the Art Gallery of New South Wales  Art Gallery of New South Wales online collection listing
 Images of Ricardo's work held by the National Gallery of Australia   National Gallery of Australia online collection listing
 Images of Ricardo's work held by the National Gallery of Victoria  NGV online collection listing

Australian printmakers
20th-century Australian sculptors
1964 births
Living people
21st-century Australian sculptors